NSI may refer to:

Organizations 
 National Savings and Investments, a state-owned savings bank in the UK
 The National Science Institute, formerly The Geek Group, former American science education organization
 National Screen Institute, a non-profit organization in Canada
 National Security Inspectorate, home security trade organisation in the UK
 National Security Intelligence, the principal civilian intelligence agency of the People's Republic of Bangladesh
 National Space Institute, a former space advocacy group in the USA
 National Statistical Institute (Bulgaria), state agency responsible for the collection and dissemination of statistical data on the population, economy and environment of the country
 Network Solutions, LLC., formerly Network Solutions Inc., a technology company founded in 1979
 Neurological Society of India, apex body representing neuroscientists of India
 The Neurosciences Institute, a former nonprofit research institute that focused on research designed to discover the biological basis of higher-brain function
 New Slovenia – Christian People's Party, a political party in Slovenia
 North-South Institute, a former policy research institution or think tank based in Canada
 Northern Sydney Institute of TAFE, an Australian vocational education and training provider
 NSÍ Runavík, a Faroe Islands football team

Indices 
 National Student Index, a system that assigns every New Zealand secondary and tertiary student with a unique identification number
 Nitrogen solubility index, a measure of the solubility of a protein
 Norwegian Scientific Index, a bibliographic database aimed at covering and rating all serious academic publication channels worldwide

Locations 
 North Sentinel Island, an island in the Andaman Island Archipelago in the Bay of Bengal
 the FAA location ID of the Naval Outlying Landing Field San Nicolas Island
 the IATA airport code of Yaoundé Nsimalen International Airport

Technology 
 NASA Standard Initiator, an electrochemical device which plays a critical role in initiating various pyrotechnic events in the National Space Transportation System
 Network Service Interface, the interface between a station and the network in a mobile communications network
 .nsi, a text file extension used by Nullsoft Scriptable Install System

Other 
 Nationwide Suspicious Activity Reporting Initiative
 National systems of innovation

See also

 NS1 (disambiguation)
 NSL (disambiguation)